Word Is Bond is the fourth studio album by Australian hardcore punk band, Deez Nuts, released on 21 April 2015 via Century Media Records and UNFD. It peaked at No. 20 on the ARIA Albums Chart and No. 34 on the German Albums Chart.

Track listing

References 

2015 albums
Deez Nuts (band) albums
Century Media Records albums
UNFD albums